Émile Amoros (born 26 August 1995) is a French sailor. He competed in the 49er event at the 2020 Summer Olympics.

References

External links
 
 
 

1995 births
Living people
French male sailors (sport)
Olympic sailors of France
Sailors at the 2020 Summer Olympics – 49er
21st-century French people